The Maison de la photographie Robert Doisneau (Robert Doisneau house of photography) is a photography gallery in the Paris suburb of Gentilly, created to commemorate the Parisian photographer Robert Doisneau and dedicated to exhibiting humanist photography.

Exhibits
Doisneau (1912–1994) was born in Gentilly, and in April 1992 consented to the use of his name for a photographic gallery there. The gallery opened in 1997 with a wide-ranging exhibition of the history of photography.

Among the photographers to have been awarded one-man shows at Maison Robert Doisneau are Graciela Iturbide (2006), Hervé Gloaguen (2006), Izis (on the occasion of the tenth anniversary of the gallery's founding, 2007), Nikos Economopoulos (2009–10). and Émile Savitry (2012/13).

From January 2006, the gallery has belonged to the intercommunality of Val de Bièvre.

The address of the gallery is 1, rue de la Division du Général Leclerc, 94250 Gentilly.

See also
 List of museums devoted to one photographer

References

External links
 Maison de la photographie Robert Doisneau - official site

Photography museums and galleries in France
Museums in Val-de-Marne
Art museums established in 1997
1997 establishments in France